Pranahuti is a ritual of reciting a mantra (hymn), offering food that is about to be consumed, to the five pranas. It is used with variations. Some invoke the goddess of food "Annapurneshwari" instead. Others may invoke the Brahman and Lord Hanuman. It is mostly practiced by orthodox Brahmins before consuming their meal. It is also performed at the time of Śrāddha, a ritual of homage to one's ancestors.

References

Hindu chants
Hindu practices
Hindu prayer and meditation